Richard Hartley Cragg (21 January 1891 – 1978) was an English professional association footballer who played as a centre forward.

References

Footballers from Burnley
English footballers
Association football forwards
Burnley F.C. players
Stockport County F.C. players
Accrington Stanley F.C. (1891) players
English Football League players
1891 births
1978 deaths
Date of death missing